Rural Hall may refer to:

Rural Hall, North Carolina, a town in Forsyth County
Rural Hall (Surry, Maine), a historic community meeting place